Cristoforo Orimina was an Italian illuminator of the 14th century. He was a painter at the court of Robert of Naples and of Joan I of Naples.

The Orimini were a patrician family of Naples, belonging to the noble seggio of Capuana. The family's residence was in what is now the Via dei Cimbri.

Cristoforo identified himself on the last leaf of an illuminated manuscript Bible. Stylistic comparison allows numerous other manuscript illuminations to be attributed to Cristoforo's hand or workshop. One of the best known of these works is the Hamilton Bible, now in Berlin.

References

Sources
C. De Clercq, "Le miniaturiste napolitain Cristoforo Orimina", Gutenberg Jahrbuch, 1968, pp. 52–65.

External links
Psalter of Cristoforo Orimina
Missale Romanum from the Workshop of Cristoforo Orimina
Short biography and bibliography, by the Vatican Library

Painters from Naples
Manuscript illuminators
Trecento painters
14th-century Italian painters
Italian male painters
Year of death unknown
Year of birth unknown
Court of Joanna I of Naples